Forcipomyia brevipennis is a species of fly in the family Ceratopogonidae ("biting midges"), in the order Diptera ("flies"). It is found in Europe and North America.

References

Further reading

External links
Diptera.info

Ceratopogonidae
Diptera of Europe
Diptera of North America
Insects described in 1826
Taxa named by Pierre-Justin-Marie Macquart